Tim Arnold may refer to:
Tim Arnold (musician) (born 1975), British musician
Tim Arnold (newsreader) (born 1960), British newsreader

See also
 Tom Arnold (disambiguation)